Richard Heath Rohmer  (born 24 January 1924) is a Canadian aviator, lawyer, adviser, author and historian.

Rohmer was born in Hamilton, Ontario, and spent some of his early youth in Pasadena, California, as well as in western Ontario at Windsor and Fort Erie. The Peterborough Examiner's lead editorial of 14 January 2009 describes Rohmer as "one of Canada's most colourful figures of the past half-century". General Rohmer served as honorary advisor to the Chief of the Defence Staff of the Canadian Armed Forces from 2014 to 2017. He was the advisor to the Minister of Veterans Affairs for the organization and conduct of Canada's celebration of the 70th Anniversary of D-Day celebrations in Normandy in June 2014 and the 70th Anniversary of the Liberation of Holland in May 2015. He is a veteran of D-Day, the Battle of Normandy and the Liberation of Holland.

Military career
After his studies in high school he worked briefly at Fleet Aerospace before joining in 1942 on his 18th birthday the Royal Canadian Air Force (RCAF). In Europe in 1943–44 as a reconnaissance pilot flying North American Mustang fighters he completed a 135 mission tour of operations at the end of November 1944 in Holland. On 17 July 1944, he had spotted a fast moving staff car, usually used to carry German officers. According to Rohmer, the German officer being carried was Field Marshal Erwin Rommel. Rohmer reported the car's location to Group Control Centre, which sent in a Spitfire piloted by Canadian Charley Fox. Rohmer took part in D-Day and the Battles of Normandy, Belgium and Holland. He is now the senior surviving Canadian veteran of all of those Battles.

In 1945 he was demobilized and transferred to the Royal Canadian Naval Reserve (RCN(R)), where he was appointed as a lieutenant (P) RCN(R) with seniority. He served at HMCS Hunter in Windsor, Ontario, as commanding officer University Naval Training Division (UNTD) from 1946 until he retired in 1948.

In 1950, he returned to the RCAF (Reserve) flying Vampire jets and commanding 400 Squadron (City of Toronto) and 411 Squadron (County of York). He retired in 1953 as a wing commander.

In 1971, he was appointed honorary Lieutenant-Colonel (and later Honorary Colonel) of 411 Air Reserve Squadron. In April 1975, he was promoted to Brigadier-General and appointed Senior Air Reserve Advisor. On 1 April 1976, he was appointed commander of the newly formed Air Reserve Group. On 31 January 1978 he was promoted to the rank of major-general and appointed Chief of Reserves. He was appointed a commander of the Order of Military Merit in December 1978 and left the military in January 1981.

On 22 December 2014, Major-General (Retired) Rohmer was named honorary advisor to the Canadian Armed Forces Chief of the Defence Staff, a three-year appointment "...created to recognize MGen (Ret’d) Rohmer’s contributions to the Canadian Armed Forces, and the unique advice and guidance that he provides to the Chief of the Defence Staff, drawing from his wealth of experience in service to Canada".
 
On 26 June 2015, in his capacity as honorary advisor to the Chief of the Defence Staff, General Rohmer was promoted to the rank of Honorary Lieutenant General by the outgoing and incoming Chiefs of the Defence Staff.

Political career
From 1957 to 1959, Rohmer was a councillor on North York township council representing Ward 1, the township's easternmost district, which included Don Mills, where his family had lived since 1954.
 
In 1958, he unsuccessfully challenged Hollis Beckett, the incumbent Progressive Conservative MPP in the riding of York East, for the Conservative nomination for the 1959 Ontario general election.

In the 1960s, he supported John Robarts's successful candidacy to lead the Ontario Progressive Conservative Party and then  served as a senior advisor and legal counsel to Premier Robarts for three years. He and Robarts conceived the idea, adopted by the provincial legislature in 1965, that the province adopt a provincial flag modelled on the red ensign. The move was in response to the Great Canadian flag debate in which the federal government decided to drop the Canadian Red Ensign in favour of the maple leaf flag.

Rohmer is a monarchist.

Mid-Canada Corridor
In the late 1960s and early 1970s, Rohmer promoted a plan for a megaproject to develop and populate the Canadian sub-Arctic which he called the "Mid-Canada Corridor". While the plan interested some industrialists, CEOs, bankers, and the railways, it failed to win support from the Canadian government.

Legal career
Rohmer, who completed his legal studies at Osgoode Hall Law School, was called to the Bar in 1951, appointed Queen's Counsel in 1960, and currently holds "not practising law" status with the Law Society of Ontario. 

During his law practice he was counsel before several administrative tribunals in land use and transportation. His major official plan change success occurred in 1972 when as counsel for Canadian National Railway and Canadian Pacific Railway and their subsidiaries he appeared before the Ontario Municipal Board in a six-week contested hearing that resulted in the change of the official plan for all of the railway use lands around Union Station from Yonge Street to Bathurst Street (185 acres) to a high density mix of residential, commercial, entertainment, hotels, sport centres and other uses including construction of the CN Tower. That official plan is the basis for years of enormous development on the lands - lands then and now worth billions of dollars. It was the largest official plan change in the history of Canada.

Literary activities
Two of Rohmer's better-known novels are Ultimatum and Separation. Ultimatum, published in 1973, features political, economic, and energy crisis themes as well as the author's opinion about the viability of the Canadian nation. It is Rohmer's most popular novel and it was the best-selling novel in Canada in 1973. Three years later, Rohmer published Separation, a novel with domestic and international political themes surrounding the ambition of Quebec separatists to establish the Canadian province as a separate nation. It stayed on the Toronto Star's best-seller list for 22 weeks. Separation was made into a television movie in 1977, and aired on the CTV network. Barry Morse was cast for a brief appearance as the British prime minister.

He is a well known Canadian author of both fiction and non-fiction. Throughout his literary career he has published over thirty books. His most recent non-fiction is The Building of the CN Tower published 2011 by RailCore Press Inc. of which he is president. His most recent novel, Ultimatum 2 was published early 2007. It fictionalizes a confrontation between the US and Russia against Canada over the building of an international high level nuclear waste disposal site in Arctic Canada. The second edition of his historical novel on the 1866–67 Canadian negotiations with the British for autonomy under the British North American Act is Sir John A's Crusade and Seward's Magnificent Folly.

Rohmer chaired the Royal Commission on Book Publishing in 1971–72.

Volunteer work
He was twice chancellor of the University of Windsor, serving a total of 13 years. In 1978, he negotiated the donation of Conrad Black's collection of Duplessis papers in exchange for an honorary degree.

He was a charter member of his local (Don Mills) Civitan club, and he served as treasurer of the international organization. His position allowed him to meet U.S. President Dwight D. Eisenhower to present Civitan's World Citizenship Award.

He was chairman of the 60th anniversary of D-Day celebrations that took place in the presence of the Queen at Juno Beach in Normandy on 6 June 2004. As ministerial advisor to the Minister of Veterans Affairs he took part in the planning, preparation and execution of the government's celebration of the 70th Anniversary of D-Day at Juno Beach, France, on 6 June 2014, and was similarly engaged in the plans for the in-Holland Canadian celebration of the 70th Anniversary of the Liberation of the Netherlands on 5 May 2015. He is now one of the very few surviving Canadian veterans of both of those Battles (Normandy and Holland).

He co-chaired the Ontario advisory committee that created the veterans' memorial unveiled on 17 September 2006 in front of the provincial legislature at Queen's Park, was chair of the Premier's Ceremonial Advisory Committee (2006-2014), and was a ten-year member of the advisory council of the Order of Ontario.

Rohmer currently holds the following honorary positions: honorary deputy commissioner of the Ontario Provincial Police; honorary chief of Toronto Paramedic Services; patron of the Toronto St. John's Ambulance (1978–2007), honorary fire chief of Collingwood, Ontario, and honorary chief of the Toronto Police Service. He is also the original honorary Chief of Paramedics in Ontario, and during the period 1978-2007 was patron of the Toronto division of St. John's Ambulance.

Family
Rohmer lives by himself in Collingwood, Ontario. His wife of 70 years, Mary Olivia (nicknamed Mary-O), passed away in January 2020. He also practices aviation litigation with the Toronto law firm of Rohmer & Fenn. He has two daughters, Ann Rohmer, a TV personality, and Catherine, a lawyer. He is a licensed pilot.

Bibliography
 Practice and Procedure Before the Highway Transport Board (1965)
 The Green North: Mid-Canada (1970)
 The Royal Commission on Book Publishing (Chair, 1972)
 The Arctic Imperative (1973) Toronto, McClelland and Stewart 
 Ultimatum (1973) Toronto, Clarke, Irwin 
 Exxoneration (1974)
 Exodus UK (1975) Toronto : McClelland and Stewart 
 Separation (1976) McClelland and Stewart 
 Balls! (1980)
 Periscope Red (1980)
 Poems by Arthur Henry Ward (1980)
 Separation two (1981)
 Pattons Gap (1981) New York : Beaufort Books 
 Triad (1982)
 Retaliation (1982)
 Massacre 747 (1984)
 Rommel and Patton (1986)
 Starmageddon (1986)
 Hour of the Fox (1988)
 Red Arctic (1989)
 John A.'s Crusade (1995)
 Death by Deficit (1996)
 Caged Eagle (2002)
 Raleigh on the Rocks (2002)
 Generally Speaking (autobiography, 2004) Toronto, Dundurn Group 
 Ultimatum 2 (2007) Toronto, Dundurn 
 Building of the CN Tower (2011)
 Building of the Sky Dome/Rogers Centre (2012)
 Sir John A's Crusade and Seward's Magnificent Folly (2013)
 Poems by A H Ward
 Practice and Procedure before the Ontario Highway Transport Board
 Report of the Royal Commission on Book Publishing (co-author)

Honours

 Appointed as a Queen's Counsel (QC) in 1960.
 Honorary Chief of Toronto Police Service (TPS) on 26 March 2015
 Named as "The Most Interesting Canadian" by the National Post

Honorary degrees
Richard Rohmer has received many honorary degrees in recognition of his service to Canada, these include:

Notes

References

External links

1924 births
Canadian Forces Air Command generals
Canadian university and college chancellors
Living people
Writers from Hamilton, Ontario
Commanders of the Order of Military Merit (Canada)
Officers of the Order of Canada
Royal Canadian Air Force personnel of World War II
Canadian King's Counsel
Members of the Order of Ontario
Chevaliers of the Légion d'honneur
Knights of the Order of St John
Recipients of the Distinguished Flying Cross (United Kingdom)
Lawyers in Ontario
Canadian expatriates in the United States
Canadian speculative fiction writers
Canadian biographers
Canadian historical novelists
Canadian World War II pilots
Canadian political consultants
Ontario municipal councillors
Canadian monarchists